Rathdowney GAA is a Gaelic Athletic Association gaelic football club in Rathdowney, County Laois, Ireland.

The club colours are green and red and the club grounds are called Kelly O'Daly Park.

The club currently amalgamates at all levels of hurling with neighbouring club Errill and in 2006 the Rathdowney-Errill team won the Laois Senior Hurling Championship for the first time ever.

The Rathdowney club itself holds 18 Laois Senior Hurling Championship titles and was the leader of the 'Order of Merit' in the number of Laois Senior Hurling Championship titles for a long number of years.

Achievements
 Laois Senior Hurling Championship: (18) 1888, 1889, 1898, 1899, 1901, 1902, 1903, 1907, 1908, 1911, 1912, 1921, 1922, 1925, 1926, 1931, 1936, 1941
 Laois Senior Football Championship: Runner-Up 1907, 1909, 1913

References

Gaelic games clubs in County Laois
Gaelic football clubs in County Laois